The 3225th Drone Squadron is a discontinued United States Air Force unit.  It was last active with the Air Force Missile Development Center, based at Holloman Air Force Base, New Mexico.  It was discontinued on 25 October 1963.

History
Organized as "Detachment 1", 3201st Air Base Support Squadron, on 26 April 1950, taking over mission of 2d Guided Missiles Squadron (GMS), 550th Guided Missiles Wing. Operated QB/DB-17 Flying Fortress drone/director aircraft drones as flying targets for the early Army Nike Ajax surface-to-air missile or for the Hughes Falcon air-to-air missiles being tested at White Sands Missile Range.   Also supplied aerial targets as needed by the Air Force Missile Development Center.

Upgraded to squadron level in 1953.  Began operating BQM-34A Firebee Drones in 1957 to provide remote-controlled target aircraft for  Center. The squadron would also support test projects and provide land recovery for target drones.
A notable moment in the squadron's history is that a Douglas/Long Beach DB-17P (Formerly B-17G-90-DL) 44-83684 flew the last operational mission by a USAF Flying Fortress on 6 August 1959.

Began operating Ryan Q2-C, the improved version of the first Firebee in 1960. It had more powerful engines, could climb faster and higher.  Formally transferred to the Missile Development Center in 1961, operated Firebee drones and assisted in its development.   Inactivated 1963 when program consolidated with  Air Defense Command at Tyndall AFB, Florida.

Lineage
 Organized as 3225th Drone Squadron on 1 January 1953
 Discontinued on 25 October 1963

Assignments
 3205th Drone Group, 1 January 1953
 Air Proving Ground Center, 1 February 1961
 Air Force Missile Development Center, 1 March 1961 – 25 October 1963

Stations
 Holloman AFB, NM. 1 January 1953 – 25 October 1963

Aircraft
 DB-17P Flying Fortress (Director Aircraft)
 QB-17L Flying Fortress (Drone Aircraft)
 QB-17N Flying Fortress (Drone Aircraft)
 BQM-34A Firebee (Drone)

References 

 E-mail communication, AFHRA, Lineage and Honors History, 3225th Drone Squadron, 10 August 2012

Military units and formations established in 1950
Military units and formations disestablished in 1963